Bramham Island is an island in the Queen Charlotte Strait region of the Central Coast of British Columbia, Canada, located on the north side of the entrance to that strait.  It lies in the entrance to the maze of waterways inland to the northeast, focussed on Seymour Inlet, which includes Belize Inlet and Allison Harbour and Nugent Sound, though it is flanked only by Slingsby Channel, on its north, and by Schooner Channel (formerly Schooner Passage) on its east.  To its west are the open waters at the convergence of Queen Charlotte Sound and Queen Charlotte Strait.  The island is approximately 23 km2 in size and is mostly low-lying hills and includes a number of freshwater lakes.

Name origin
The island was named c. 1866 by Captain Pender of the Royal Navy after Bramham Park, the Yorkshire home of George Lane-Fox, in association with Slingsby Channel and the Fox Islands.  "[Bramham Park] ....A battle was fought in this neighborhood in 1408, which subsequently secured the Crown of England to Henry IV."

See also
Blunden Harbour

References

Islands of British Columbia
Central Coast of British Columbia